Edmond Bimont was a French athlete. He competed in the men's individual cross country event at the 1920 Summer Olympics.

References

Year of birth missing
Year of death missing
Athletes (track and field) at the 1920 Summer Olympics
French male long-distance runners
Olympic athletes of France
Place of birth missing
Olympic cross country runners